Major General Ian Ross Campbell,  (23 March 1900 – 31 October 1997) was an Australian soldier and businessman. He served during the Second World War and Korean War.

Early life
Ian Ross Campbell was born in Moss Vale, New South Wales, on 23 March 1900, the younger of the two sons of Lieutenant Colonel Gerald Ross Campbell, a barrister and soldier, and his wife Mary Fraser  Stewart. He was educated at Scots College, Sydney. He entered the Royal Military College, Duntroon, on 26 March 1919.  He won the Sword of Honour on graduation on 14 December 1922, and was commissioned as a second lieutenant.

On 20 August 1923, Campbell was posted to the 36th Battalion as its adjutant and quartermaster. From 9 September 1926 to 3 November 1926 he served on exchange in India with the Royal Scots Fusiliers of the British Army. He became a keen mountain climber, and participated in climbing on Mount Everest. On return to Australia, he was assigned to the headquarters of the 1st Division, and then was adjutant and quartermaster of the Sydney University Scouts. He married Patience A. Russell at St James' Church, Sydney, on 26 April 1927 and had a home "Pine Lodge" in Moss Vale. They had one daughter, Gillian on 22 April 1928. Patience was a daughter of barrister F. A. A. "Frank" Campbell KC.

Promoted to captain on 14 December 1930, Campbell served as aide de camp to the Governor of New South Wales from 11 November 1932 to 5 June 1934. He then became adjutant and quartermaster of the Queensland-based 26th Battalion, which was linked with the 15th Battalion to form the 15th/26th Battalion on 1 November 1934. He attended the Staff College, Camberley, in England from 15 November 1935 to 24 March  1938. On returning to Australia he became a staff officer in the Adjutant General's Branch.

Second World War
On 13 October 1939, Campbell joined the Second Australian Imperial Force (AIF), and was given the AIF service number VX21. He was initially assigned to the 2/1st Battalion as a major, but became the brigade major of the 16th Brigade that same day. He was made a Companion of the Distinguished Service Order for his part in the Battle of Bardia. His citation read:

Campbell became the commander of the 2/1st Battalion, with the temporary rank of lieutenant colonel on 8 April 1941, soon after he arrived on Crete. He took charge of a hastily assembled force of Australian troops from the 2/1st and 2/11th Battalions and Greek troops charged with the defence of Retimo airfield. For his role in the defence of the airfield, he was mentioned in despatches on 11 December 1942. He was awarded a bar to his 
Distinguished Service Order on 29 August 1946. His citation read:

He was also appointed a Knight Commander of the Order of the Phoenix by Greece.

Campbell was a prisoner of war in Germany until he was liberated on 14 April 1945. He commanded the reception camp for freed Australian prisoners from 11 May to 16 September 1945, with the temporary rank of brigadier, after which he returned to Australia, arriving back in Adelaide on 21 October 1945.

Later life
On 19 November 1945, Campbell was appointed Deputy Adjutant General of the Australian Military Forces, with the substantive rank of lieutenant colonel from 30 September 1946. He was appointed the Director of Military Training at Army Headquarters with the temporary rank of brigadier on 1 March 1947, and the permanent rank of colonel from 18 October 1948. On 1 January 1949 he assumed command of the 34th Brigade, which became the 1st Brigade on 20 May 1949. He was in charge of the administrative headquarters of the Australian Forces in Korea and the British Commonwealth Occupation Force in Japan from 1951 to 1953. He was made a commander of the Order of the British Empire in the 1954 New Year Honours on 29 December 1953.

Campbell became the commandant of the Australian Army Staff College on 14 August 1953, and then of the Royal Military College, Duntroon, on 24 May 1954. He was promoted to the temporary rank of major general on 25 May 1954, which became substantive on 13 September 1954. He retired from the Army on 23 March 1957.

After leaving the Army, Campbell worked for James Hardie Industries. He later served as chairman of the New South Wales Red Cross, and worked for other charities. His wife Patience died in 1961. He married Irene Cardamatis in 1967.

Campbell died on 31 October 1997, and was buried in Bong Bong Presbyterian Cemetery in Moss Vale. The people of Crete sent an urn of soil from Crete that was buried with him.

Notes

1900 births
1997 deaths
Military personnel from New South Wales
Graduates of the Staff College, Camberley
Australian generals
Australian Army personnel of World War II
Australian Companions of the Distinguished Service Order
Australian Commanders of the Order of the British Empire
Australian military personnel of the Korean War
Australian prisoners of war
Royal Military College, Duntroon graduates
World War II prisoners of war held by Germany
Red Cross personnel
Commanders of the Order of the Phoenix (Greece)
Battle of Crete